Arizona's 4th congressional district is a congressional district located in the U.S. state of Arizona. It is currently represented by Democrat Greg Stanton. The district is located entirely within Maricopa County.

History
Arizona first gained a fourth district after the 1970 Census. It covered the entire northeastern portion of the state, from northern Phoenix all the way to the New Mexico border. However, the great majority of its vote was cast in northern Phoenix, which was heavily Republican.

With the Valley's dramatic growth over the next two decades, the district was made significantly more compact in the 1990 Census, losing all of its territory outside of the Phoenix area. Like its predecessor, it was reliably Republican.

After the 2000 Census, the old 4th essentially became the 3rd district. A new 4th district was created in the heavily Latino portions of inner Phoenix. This district was the only safe Democratic district in the Phoenix area, and remained in Democratic hands for its entire existence in this configuration.

After the 2010 Census, this district essentially became the 7th district, while a new 4th was created in the mostly rural western and northwestern portion of the state. While the old 4th was easily the most Democratic district in Arizona, the new 4th is far and away the most Republican district in Arizona, and one of the most Republican districts in the West. In all presidential elections contested since the current 4th was created, it gave the Republican presidential nominee his highest margin in the state.

Area covered
The current 4th district is located entirely within Maricopa County and covers the following municipalities:

 Chandler (portions)
 Mesa (portions)
 Phoenix (portions)
 Scottsdale (portions)
 Tempe

Election results from statewide races

List of members representing the district 
Arizona began sending a fourth member to the House after the 1970 Census.

Recent election results

2002

2004

2006

2008

2010

2012

2014

2016

2018

2020

2022

See also

 Arizona's congressional districts
 List of United States congressional districts

References
General

Specific
 Demographic data from census.gov
 1998 Election data from CNN.com
 2000 Election data from CNN.com
 2002 Election data from CBSNews.com
 2004 Election data from CNN.com

External links
 Maps of Congressional Districts first in effect for the 2002 election
 Tentative Final Congressional Maps for the 2012 election

04
Government of Gila County, Arizona
Government of La Paz County, Arizona
Government of Maricopa County, Arizona
Government of Mohave County, Arizona
Government of Yavapai County, Arizona
Government of Yuma County, Arizona
Lake Havasu City, Arizona
Kingman, Arizona
Prescott, Arizona
Yuma, Arizona
Constituencies established in 1973
1973 establishments in Arizona